Jennifer Plumb is an American politician and pediatric trauma doctor from Salt Lake City, Utah. She represents Utah's 9th senate district in the Utah State Senate.

Education and career
Jennifer Plumb is a pediatric emergency department doctor. She has a Masters' degree in public health. She is the director of Utah Naloxone, which she founded in 2015, after her brother died of a heroin overdose. As an opioid mitigation advocate she lobbied for legislation on syringe exchanges and naloxone access. She is also a member of Utah's opioid abuse task force.

Political career
Jennifer Plumb ran against incumbent Senator Derek Kitchen in 2018 and lost.

In a rematch of that contest, Plumb defeated Kitchen by just 61 votes in the democratic primary election for senate district 9 in June 2022. Facing only a write-in candidate, she won 99% of the votes in the 2022 Utah Senate election. Plumb will serve as assistant minority whip in the Utah Senate starting in 2023.

External links
Senator Plumb's page on the Utah Senate website

References

Living people
21st-century American politicians
Politicians from Salt Lake City
Democratic Party Utah state senators
Year of birth missing (living people)
21st-century American women politicians
Women state legislators in Utah